Ice Exercise 2009 (ICEX) was a two-week US naval military exercise that took place in March 2009. Its aim was to test submarine operability and war-fighting capability in Arctic conditions.

Overview

The Russian Pacific Ocean Fleet said it would closely monitor the exercise.

Michael Byers of The Globe and Mail speculated that the USS Annapolis might travel to Alaska using a 2,000-kilometre shortcut through the Northwest Passage, which Canada claims as "internal waters". According to maritime law, in Canadian internal waters, Washington must obtain Ottawa's permission for any voyage, whether on the surface or submerged. According to Byers, "Ottawa's failure to protest against the submarine transits could constitute evidence that - in the corridors of international diplomacy, where it really matters - Canada has already surrendered its claim."

References

Military exercises involving the United States
Arctic challenges